The 2012 European Shotgun Championships were held in Larnaca, Cyprus from May 19-25, 2012.

Men's events

Women's events

Men's Junior events

Women's Junior events

Medal summary

Seniors

Juniors

See also
 European Shooting Confederation
 International Shooting Sport Federation
 List of medalists at the European Shotgun Championships

References

External links
 Results

European Shooting Championships
European Shooting Championships
2012 European Shotgun Championships
European Shotgun Championships
Sport in Larnaca
Shooting competitions in Cyprus